Sabrina Setlur (born 10 January 1974), formerly known as Schwester S., is a German singer,  rapper, songwriter and occasional actress. Her debut was in 1995 under the guidance of 3p Records executive and mentor Moses Pelham, producer of her breakthrough single "Ja Klar." Following the drop of her pseudonym and a number-one single, "Du Liebst Mich Nicht," in 1997, a series of hit records established her position as Germany's "best known and highest-selling female rap act" to date.

Setlur is the only artist to date to have ever won three ECHO Awards for "Best National Female Artist." According to several sources, she has sold more than two million albums and singles domestically.

Her most recent album was released in 2007.

Early life
Setlur is the elder of two sisters born to Krishnan Setlur, a Kannadiga banker, and his wife Theresa, a Malayali nurse, in Frankfurt am Main, Hesse. She and her four-years-younger sister Yvonne were primarily raised in Bad Soden am Taunus, where Setlur became acquainted with future Rödelheim Hartreim Projekt members Thomas Hofmann and Moses Pelham in her high school years. After a spontaneous performance of Dr. Dre's "Nuthin' But a "G" Thang" in 1993 Hofmann and Pelham asked her to contribute a verse to the early Rödelheim Hartreim Projekt track "Wenn Es Nicht Hart Ist." As she had never rapped before, Setlur reportedly hesitated; but soon accepted their invitation into the recording studio. Impressed by her talent, Pelham offered her a record contract with Pelham Power Productions, and as a result Setlur quit studying business administration and instead signed a deal with 3p Records.

Music career

1990s
In 1995, Setlur released the Moses Pelham-produced double A single "Hier kommt die Schwester/Pass auf" under the pseudonym Schwester S. Her breakthrough single was "Ja klar" from her debut album S ist soweit (ranking #11), which was released in February 1995.
In 1996 she won the  ECHO award for "Best Female Artist". In addition, she began her own hip hop broadcast on the radio station hr3.

After 3p's sudden major label change in 1997 Setlur released her second album Die Neue S-Klasse under her birth name in February of the same year. The album debuted at #10 on the albums chart and spawned Setlur's first and only #1 single "Du Liebst Mich Nicht", whose sales earned her another ECHO and a Comet award for "Best Female Artist" in 1998, as well as a golden record for more than 300.000 units sold. In the meantime Setlur was featured on the singles by Faithless' "Bring My Family Back" and then-newcomer Xavier Naidoo's "Freisein".

In 1999 Setlur's third album Aus der Sicht und mit den Worten von... outperformed the success of its predecessors when it peaked at #3 on the German albums chart. Though its singles could not link to previous accomplishments, the album's sales earned Setlur her third ECHO for "Best Female Artist" in 2000. A few months later Sabrina constantly hit the headlines when paparazzi revealed her relationship to former tennis star Boris Becker. The couple separated shortly afterwards, but due to conflicting rumours about anorexia Setlur's name maintained popular in magazines and papers. "I was suddenly in the newspaper, not because of my job, only because we were together", said Setlur in an interview with online magazine Spiegel Online. "Suddenly they wrote stuff about me, which hasn't something to do with my job."

2000s

Setlur channeled much of her heavily media-discussed experiences into the production of her fourth studio album Sabs. Released in November 2003, the CD received a mixed reception from most professional music critics, with Laut calling it "a chavvy and antiquated [but] good rap album" and CDStarts declaring it a "insignificant [but] practiced comeback." Promoted by Setlur's engagement as a judge on the third installment of the German reality television series Popstars - Das Duell (which created both the male quartet Overground and the girl group Preluders), the album spawned four moderately successful singles, including "Liebe", a collaboration with Glashaus and labelmate Franziska. Setlur used to contend for the Eurovision Song Contest 2004 in Istanbul. Following several weeks of promotional appearances, Setlur entered the competition on 19 March 2004 with the album's second single, and although considered as a favourite by the media, Setlur failed to place within the top 5, eventually falling against singer Max Mutzke and his song "Can't Wait Until Tonight."

In early 2005 she released a best of compilation, titled 10 Jahre Sabrina Setlur. The compilation album features all of her singles (by then fifteen) as well as the album tracks "Ich bin raus" (taken from S ist soweit) and "Ohne Worte" (from Aus der Sicht und mit den Worten von...) but did not include new material. The song "Mein Herz", originally released on Sabs, was used as single to promote the album.

Returning from yet another musical hiatus, Setlur's fifth studio album Rot was released on 24 August 2007.

Kraftwerk
In May 2016, veteran band Kraftwerk lost in German court a 19-year copyright infringement legal suit against Setlur, for her use of a two-second sample from the song "Metal on Metal" on their 1977 album Trans-Europe Express in her 1997 song "Nur mir". Later in July 2019, Kraftwerk won the legal case in the European Court of Justice.

Discography

S ist soweit (1995)
Die neue S-Klasse (1997)
Aus der Sicht und mit den Worten von... (1999)
Sabs (2003)
Rot (2007)

Awards
1995 - Comet (VIVA): "Best Hip Hop Artist 1995"
1996 - ECHO: "Best National Artist 1995"
1997 - Comet (VIVA): "Best National Act 1997"
1998 - Comet (VIVA): "Best National Video" for "Glaubst Du mir"
1998 - ECHO: "Best National Artist 1997"
1999 - Silber Otto: "Best Hip Hop Act"
1999 - RSH-Gold: "Best Teamwork" (with Xavier Naidoo)
2000 - Goldene Kamera: "Outstanding Achievements in German Pop Music"
2000 - Regenbogen Award: "Most Valuable Artist in Hip Hop"
2000 - ECHO: "Best National Artist"
2008 - German Multimedia Award for her website rot.fm (supporting her fifth studio album Rot)

References

External links

1974 births
Living people
Musicians from Frankfurt
German women singers
German women musicians
German women rappers
German rappers
German people of Indian descent